Helene Tursten (born in Gothenburg on February 17, 1954) is a Swedish writer of crime fiction.

Work
The main character in her stories is Detective Inspector Irene Huss. Before becoming an author, Tursten worked as a nurse and then a dentist, but was forced to leave due to illness. During her illness she worked as a translator of medical articles.

Works

Books 

 1998 — Den krossade tanghästen (English translation: Detective Inspector Huss, 2003)
 1999 — Nattrond (English translation: Night Rounds, 2012)
 1999 — Tatuerad torso (English translation: The Torso, 2006)
 2002 — Kallt mord
 2002 — Glasdjävulen (English translation: The Glass Devil, 2007)
 2004 — Guldkalven (English translation: The Golden Calf, 2013)
 2005 — Eldsdansen (English translation: The Fire Dance, 2014)
 2007 — En man med litet ansikte (English translation: The Beige Man, 2015)
 2008 — Det lömska nätet (English translation: The Treacherous Net, 2015)
 2010 — Den som vakar i mörkret (English translation: Who Watcheth, 2016)
 2012 — I skydd av skuggorna (English translation: Protected by the Shadows, 2017)
 2013 — Mina Mindre Mord och Mysterier (English translation: An Elderly Lady is Up to No Good: Stories, tr. Marlaine Delargy, 2018)
 2014— Jaktmark (English translation: Hunting Game, tr. Paul Norlen 2019)
 2016 — Sandgrav  (English translation: Winter Grave, tr. Marlaine Delargy, 2018)
 2018 — Snödrev (English translation: Snowdrift, tr. Marlaine Delargy, 2018)
 2020 — Äldre dam med mörka hemligheter (English translation: An Elderly Lady Must Not Be Crossed: Stories, tr. Marlaine Delargy, 2021)

Films 
Several films have been made derived from Tursten's works featuring Irene Huss, produced by Illusion Films and Yellow Bird Films.  These are in Swedish with Danish and English sub-titles.

Irene Huss movies are a collection of films about a fictional Swedish police officer played by Angela Kovács.  A total of twelve 90-minute films produced between the years 2007 to 2011.  All but three movies were based on the books of the same name titles, written by author Helene Tursten.  The last three films have been produced based instead on the books' characters and are thus independent stories.  Films set in the Gothenburg area, where viewers get to follow both Irene Huss in the work as a police officer but also in her family, which are often strongly influenced by her work.

The twelve films were made in two installments;  a first round in which the films were released in 2007-2008 and then a second round in which the films were released in 2011. All films except the first one was released directly on DVD, while the first film went up to the cinema before it was released on DVD.  The films have also been shown countless times on Kanal 5 in Sweden and ARD in Germany, as these have been some of the financiers to the movies. Johan Fälemark and Hillevi Råberg were film producers in the first season while Daniel Ahlqvist added as the third film producer in the second season.

 2007 — Irene Huss — Tatuerad Torso
 2007 — Den krossade tanghästen
 2008 — Nattrond
 2008 — Glasdjävulen
 2008 — Eldsdansen
 2008 — Guldkalven
 2011 — Den som vakar i mörkret
 2011 — Det lömska nätet
 2011 — En man med litet ansikte
 2011 — Tystnadens cirkel 
 2011 — I skydd av skuggorna 
 2011 — Jagad vittne

References

External links
  Video introduction by Helene Tursten (in Swedish) to Irene Huss films made for Swedish TV.
  (in Swedish).
 Review of Detective Inspector Huss in January Magazine.

1954 births
Living people
People from Gothenburg
Swedish-language writers
Swedish crime fiction writers
Women mystery writers
Swedish mystery writers